Saint Patrick's Catholic Church is a Catholic Church in the Diocese of St. Petersburg, located in Tampa, Florida. The Church is located at 4518 South Manhattan Avenue and serves about 675 families.

History of the Church
The Church was founded as a Mission of Christ The King, also in Tampa, in 1950. The building was built in 1958.  The first Pastor was Father Cronin. Since 1987, the church has been part of the Franciscan Community, first under Father Venard Moffitt.

In 1961, a Catholic School opened on the premises.  The school closed in 2006, and the old school buildings are currently used between Religious Education and a private school for autistic children.

The Church's current pastor is Father Sal Stefula.

The Church grounds

The main building of the church is situated in the front, behind it a large Social Hall and Kitchen.  The hall features a stage and a large amount of room for tables, formerly used by the school's students as a cafeteria.  After the morning Sunday Masses, doughnuts are sold in the social hall, making it a popular place to sit and chat with others.  In between the two old school buildings there is a small garden with the Stations of the Cross, dedicated to victims of abortion.

Masses
The church has a daily Mass Monday–Saturday at 8:30 AM. Also, there is a 5:00 PM Mass on Saturday, and four Masses on Sunday– 7:30 AM, 9:00 AM, 11:00 AM (Spanish-English Bilingual) and 6:00 PM (Youth Themed).  Reconciliation takes place from 3:30 to 4:30 PM every Saturday.

External links
Saint Patrick's Site
 Diocesan Site

Roman Catholic Diocese of Saint Petersburg
Roman Catholic churches in Florida
Roman Catholic churches in Tampa, Florida
1950 establishments in Florida
Churches completed in 1958